The Howard Jarvis Taxpayers Association is a California-based nonprofit lobbying and policy organization that advocates for Proposition 13 and Proposition 218. Officially nonpartisan, the organization also advocates against raising taxes in California.

History 

Following the passage of Proposition 13 in June 1978, anti-tax activist Howard Jarvis founded an organization called the California Tax Reduction Movement. The goals of this organization were to protect Proposition 13 and further the "taxpayer revolt."  Upon Jarvis's death in 1986, his former personal assistant, Joel Fox, took over as the organization's head, formally incorporating and changing its name to Howard Jarvis Taxpayers Association.

Mission 

The Howard Jarvis Taxpayers Association is known for its strong support of Proposition 13, which was approved by California voters in June 1978. Proposition 13 significantly limited real property tax increases for California homeowners and businesses.

The association opposes taxes on California persons and businesses. Its motto, "Dedicated to protecting Proposition 13 and promoting taxpayers' rights", expresses its primary mission of defending Proposition 13.  It mobilizes its members to support or oppose legislation, including ballot initiatives.  It also endorses candidates in California elections and, through its separate campaign committees, is a source of campaign funds for the elections of candidates and ballot measures in California.

California Commentary 

Starting in 2003, the association began distributing a weekly opinion piece known as California Commentary.

Joel Fox Presidency 

Joel Fox, who had been a senior aide to Howard Jarvis, was the first president of the association, and served until the end of 1998.  Joel Fox led the association into what observers have described as one of the most politically powerful organizations in California.

Notable events 

Notable events during Joel Fox's presidency include:

Nordlinger v. Hahn Legal Challenge to Proposition 13 

Fox guided the association against a successful legal challenge to Proposition 13 that landed before the United States Supreme Court.  The case, known as Nordlinger v. Hahn, involved the issue of whether Proposition 13's reassessment scheme violated the Equal Protection Clause of the Fourteenth Amendment to the United States Constitution.  On June 18, 1992, the court held that Proposition 13's acquisition-value assessment scheme does not violate the federal Equal Protection Clause.

When the court agreed to hear the Nordlinger case, Fox said the case was "life or death for Proposition 13."  Fox also said:

Proposition 218 (1996) 

In 1996, Fox led Proposition 218 ("Right To Vote On Taxes Act"), sponsored by the association, as a constitutional follow-up to Proposition 13.  During the November 1996 election, California voters approved the Proposition 218 initiative constitutional amendment.

Proposition 218 established constitutional limits on the ability of local governments to levy benefit assessments on real property and property-related fees and charges. Proposition 218 also requires voter approval before a local government can impose, increase, or extend any local tax. Proposition 218 also constitutionally reserves to local voters the right to use the initiative power to reduce or repeal any local tax, assessment, fee or charge.

The Proposition 218 constitutional amendment is the only successful statewide ballot initiative sponsored by the association since its formation in 1989.

Jon Coupal Presidency 

Jon Coupal, who had been Director of Legal Affairs for the association from 1991 to 1998, is its second and current president, having assumed the office at the beginning of 1999.

Jon Coupal writes a column on California issues every Sunday in the Opinion section on the Southern California News Group's eleven newspapers and websites.

References

External links

Organizations based in California
Taxation in California
Taxpayer groups
Lobbying organizations in the United States
Property taxes
Conservative organizations in the United States